The Fairy Queen is a character in Brandon Mull's 2000s children's fantasy series Fablehaven.

In the Books

Fablehaven
The fairy queen shrine at Fablehaven is located in a beautiful park, on an island in the middle of a naiad pond. Unworthy visitors are instantly obliterated, as goes the story of the caretaker who was turned into dandelion fluff. Kendra, however, must visit the Fairy Queen for help to save her family, and Fablehaven from Muriel and Bahumat. Kendra would end up walking on her island and living and then the Fairy Queen would help her summon the fairies to war and save Fablehaven.

Fablehaven: Grip of the Shadow Plague
It is said early in the book by a fairy at the Fairbanks' that Kendra can make orders in the name of the Queen. Kendra make some of these orders. Later in the book, Kendra once again goes to the Fairy Queen's shrine to seek help. The Queen introduces herself not as "a fairy" but as "the fairy," the mother, the eldest sister. She does not dwell on earth, but in a different realm where she cannot be tainted by dark magic. Her only portals to the human world is through her shrines located on some of the magical preserves.  The Queen, would destroy the shrine at Fablehaven and transfer the energy into a single object, a stone, that can destroy the nail that caused the plague. The stone would end up saving Fablehaven, but it killed Lena, and the Fairy Queen's shrine at Fablehaven would be destroyed.

Fablehaven: Secrets of the Dragon Sanctuary
In the fourth book, the Fairy Queen briefly appears at Wyrmroost when Kendra is seeking help at the dragon sanctuary. The Queen explains her feelings concerning the history of the Astrids, golden owls with human faces. Kendra gets confused that the Fairy Queen is still upset about the astrids' failure.  Finally the Fairy Queen partially gives in to Kendra's request to give the astrids another chance.

Fablehaven: Keys to the Demon Prison
She has no wings (but still flies) and is a unicorn in human form.  First unicorn.  She was able to forgive the astrids in spite of their "failure."  The Fairy Queen agrees to Bracken's daring suggestion that just might save the world, but loses her realm.  She is also Bracken's mother.

Fablehaven series